Faith Idehen (born 5 February 1973) is a retired female sprinter from Nigeria. At the 1992 Summer Olympics she, together with Beatrice Utondu, Christy Opara Thompson and Mary Onyali, won a bronze medal in 4 x 100 metres relay.

Idehen attended the University of Alabama on a track scholarship. She is married to fellow track athlete Festus Igbinoghene and they have a son, Noah Igbinoghene, who is a National Football League player.

Achievements

References

External links

1973 births
Living people
Nigerian female sprinters
Athletes (track and field) at the 1992 Summer Olympics
Olympic athletes of Nigeria
Olympic bronze medalists for Nigeria
Athletes (track and field) at the 1994 Commonwealth Games
Commonwealth Games gold medallists for Nigeria
Commonwealth Games medallists in athletics
Olympic bronze medalists in athletics (track and field)
Universiade medalists in athletics (track and field)
Universiade silver medalists for Nigeria
Alabama Crimson Tide women's track and field athletes
Medalists at the 1992 Summer Olympics
Medalists at the 1993 Summer Universiade
Olympic female sprinters
20th-century Nigerian women
21st-century Nigerian women
Medallists at the 1994 Commonwealth Games